Birmingham Handsworth was a parliamentary constituency centred on the Handsworth district of Birmingham. It returned one Member of Parliament (MP)  to the House of Commons of the Parliament of the United Kingdom. It was abolished in 1983.

Boundaries 
1885–1918: The Sessional Divisions of Rushall Tipton, Wednesbury, and West Bromwich, and the Municipal Borough of Walsall. The constituency was created, as a county constituency, for the 1885 general election when it was the Handsworth division of Staffordshire. In 1885 the area was to the north of the parliamentary borough of Birmingham and was the south-eastern county division of Staffordshire. Birmingham, which from 1889 was a county borough, with city status, was mostly located in the geographic county of Warwickshire, but gradually expanded into adjacent areas of Staffordshire and Worcestershire.

The constituency bordered to the west West Bromwich, Wednesbury and Walsall; to the north Lichfield; to the east Tamworth and to the south Birmingham West and Birmingham North.

1918–1955: The County Borough of Birmingham wards of Handsworth, Sandwell, and Soho. By 1918 the Handsworth area had been incorporated within the growing city of Birmingham. For the 1918 general election it became a borough constituency as Birmingham Handsworth.

1955–1974: The County Borough of Birmingham wards of Handsworth, Lozells, and Sandwell. Lozells ward was formerly in Birmingham Aston. Soho ward became part of Birmingham All Saints.

1974–1983: The County Borough of Birmingham wards of Aston, Handsworth, and Sandwell.

The constituency disappeared at the 1983 general election. Sandwell ward became 32.9% of Birmingham Ladywood, Handsworth ward became 24.8% of Birmingham Perry Barr and Aston ward became 11.9% of Birmingham Small Heath.

Members of Parliament

Election results

Elections in the 1880s

Elections in the 1890s

Elections in the 1900s

Elections in the 1910s 

General Election 1914–15:

Another General Election was required to take place before the end of 1915. The political parties had been making preparations for an election to take place and by the July 1914, the following candidates had been selected; 
Unionist: Ernest Meysey-Thompson
Labour: John Davison

Elections in the 1920s

Elections in the 1930s

Elections in the 1940s 
General Election 1939–40

Another General Election was required to take place before the end of 1940. The political parties had been making preparations for an election to take place and by the Autumn of 1939, the following candidates had been selected; 
Conservative: Oliver Locker-Lampson
Labour: A G Chattaway

Elections in the 1950s 

Independent Peace candidate

Elections in the 1960s

Elections in the 1970s

See also
List of former United Kingdom Parliament constituencies

References 

 Boundaries of Parliamentary Constituencies 1885-1972, compiled and edited by F.W.S. Craig (Parliamentary Reference Publications 1972)
 British Parliamentary Constituencies: A Statistical Compendium, by Ivor Crewe and Anthony Fox (Faber and Faber 1984)

Parliamentary constituencies in Birmingham, West Midlands (historic)
Parliamentary constituencies in Staffordshire (historic)
Constituencies of the Parliament of the United Kingdom established in 1885
Constituencies of the Parliament of the United Kingdom disestablished in 1983